The United States' Ken Flach and Robert Seguso defeated Spain's Sergio Casal and Emilio Sánchez in the final, 6–3, 6–4, 6–7(5–7), 6–7(1–7), 9–7 to win the gold medal in Men's Singles tennis at the 1988 Summer Olympics. It was the second consecutive American victory in the event (though tennis had been discontinued from the Olympics in the intervening 64 years) and its record-equaling third gold overall. Czechoslovaka's Miloslav Mečíř and Milan Šrejber and Sweden's Stefan Edberg and Anders Järryd won the bronze medals. It was the first medal in the event for Spain, Sweden, and Czechoslovakia.

The tournament was held from 23 September to 1 October at the Seoul Olympic Park Tennis Center in Seoul, South Korea. There were 62 players (31 pairs) from 31 nations, with the Colombian pair withdrawing. Each nation had only one pair. There was no bronze-medal match.

Background

This was the eighth appearance of men's doubles tennis. The event has been held at every Summer Olympics where tennis has been on the program: from 1896 to 1924 and then from 1988 to the current program. A demonstration event was held in 1968.

The top seed and favorite was the American pair, Ken Flach and Robert Seguso, who had just won their second consecutive Wimbledon title (adding to earlier U.S. and French Open wins.

Brazil, the People's Republic of China, West Germany, Indonesia, Israel, New Zealand, Nigeria, Paraguay, South Korea, the Soviet Union, Yugoslavia, and Zimbabwe each made their debut in the event. Great Britain made its sixth appearance in the event, most of any nation.

Competition format

The competition was a single-elimination tournament. Unlike the pre-hiatus tournaments, there was no bronze-medal match. All matches were best-of-five sets. Tiebreaks were used for any set before the fifth that reached 6–6.

Schedule

All times are Korea Standard Time adjusted for daylight savings (UTC+10)

Seeds

Draw

Finals

Top half

Bottom half

References

 ITF 1988 Summer Olympics Men's Doubles Draw

1988

Men's Doubles
Men's events at the 1988 Summer Olympics